St. John's was a federal electoral district in Quebec, Canada that was represented in the House of Commons of Canada from 1867 to 1892.

It was created by the British North America Act, 1867. It consisted of the Parishes of Saint Luc, Blairfindie, Saint Jean, Saint Valentin and Lacolle, and the islands in the River Richelieu lying near those parishes.

The electoral district was abolished in 1892, when it was redistributed into Missisquoi and St. Johns—Iberville ridings.

Members of Parliament

This riding elected the following Members of Parliament:

Election results

See also 
 List of Canadian federal electoral districts
 Past Canadian electoral districts

External links 
 Riding history from the Library of Parliament

Former federal electoral districts of Quebec